Chilote is a dialect of Spanish language spoken on the southern Chilean islands of Chiloé Archipelago ( or simply, Chiloé). It has distinct differences from standard Chilean Spanish in accent, pronunciation, grammar and vocabulary, especially by influences from local dialect of Mapuche language (called huilliche or veliche) and some conservative traits.

After the battle of Curalaba (1598) and the Destruction of the Seven Cities Chiloé was further isolated from the rest of Chile and developed a culture with little influence from Spain or mainland Chile. During the 17th and 18th centuries most of the archipelago's population was bilingual and according to John Byron many Spaniards preferred to use Mapudungun because they considered it more beautiful. Around the same time, Governor Narciso de Santa María complained that Spanish settlers in the islands could not speak Spanish properly, but could speak Veliche, and that this second language was more used.

Phonology
Transformation of the groups  and  into .
Preservation of the nasal consonant velar  (written "ng" or "gn") in words of Mapuche origin. This phoneme does not exist in standard Spanish. Eg: culenges  (In the rest of Chile, it is said culengues ).
There are also other places in the southern and western parts where they are both pronounced .
It is common for "ch" to be pronounced as a fricative , similar to an English "sh". This fricative pronunciation has a social stigma associated in Chile.
In some places the group "tr" is pronounced differently according to the etymology of the word: if it comes from Spanish, both consonants are clearly pronounced, while if the word comes from Mapudungun, it is pronounced , similar to a "chr". However, in the rest of the places, the words of Mapuche origin that had this consonant have replaced it by the "chr" and in the rest this group is pronounced  as in most dialects of Spanish, unlike what occurs in Chilean Spanish, in which you tend to use  regardless of the origin of the word.
Paragoge: A vowel is added to the end of words ending in "r" or "c". Eg: andar , Quenac .
The prosodic aspects of Chiloé Spanish have recently been studied and show an ascending intonation.

Morphology
The Spanish of the Chiloé Archipelago shares a number of morphological characteristics with that of northern New Mexico and southern Colorado and with that of rural areas of the Mexican states of Chihuahua, Durango, Sonora, Tlaxcala, Jalisco, and Guanajuato:
 Second-person preterite forms ending in  instead of the standard .
The reverse occurs in New Mexico and rural Mexico, where  verbs can be conjugated  in the present tense.
Non-standard -g- in many verb roots, such as  'believe'.
This is found in Traditional New Mexican Spanish but is not attested within Mexico.

References

Spanish dialects of South America
Chiloé Archipelago
Languages of Chile